The following list of primate viruses is not exhaustive.  Many viruses specific to non-human primates nevertheless are known to jump and infect humans and, thus, become known as zoonoses.

Zoonotic primate
Monkeys
Animal virology